Archibald Turner may refer to:
 Archibald Turner (footballer)
 Archibald Turner (minister)